Dąbrówka Mała  is a village in the administrative district of Gmina Szczaniec, within Świebodzin County, Lubusz Voivodeship, in western Poland.

In the years 1975-1998 the village has a Zielona Góra Voivodeship. The village has a population of 296.

Notable residents
Elisabeth Lupka (1902–1949), Nazi concentration camp guard executed for war crimes

References

Villages in Świebodzin County